Virbia palmeri is a moth in the family Erebidae. It was described by Herbert Druce in 1911. It is found in Colombia.

References

Moths described in 1911
palmeri